The Ruins of the Church of Kuta or Fuerza de Bongabong are the remnants of an 18th-century church built by the Recollects in Bongabong, Oriental Mindoro.

History
The Recollect mission of Bongabong was first mentioned in the Libro de Registros in 1737. The church served as garrison for the townsfolk in times of Muslim raids. It was destroyed during the Muslim raids between 1753 and 1754.

On 25 June 2012, the site was declared by the National Historical Commission of the Philippines as a National Historical Landmark.

References 

Spanish Colonial architecture in the Philippines
Church ruins in the Philippines
Buildings and structures in Oriental Mindoro
Roman Catholic churches in Oriental Mindoro
National Historical Landmarks of the Philippines